MacMhuirich may refer to:

MacMhuirich (surname), a surname in the Scottish Gaelic language 
Clann MacMhuirich, also known as Clann Mhuirich, the MacMhuirich bardic family

See also
Clann Mhuirich (disambiguation)